The 1961–62 Liga Leumit season saw Hapoel Petah Tikva crowned as champions for the fourth successive season (a record which no other club has yet repeated). Shlomo Levi of Hapoel Haifa and Yitzhak Nizri of Hapoel Tiberias were the league's joint top scorers with 16 goals each.

Maccabi Netanya were relegated to Liga Alef.

Final table

Results

References
Israel - List of final tables RSSSF

Liga Leumit seasons
Israel
1961–62 in Israeli football leagues